Charles Beckman (born March 1, 1965) is a former professional tennis player from the United States.

Career
A doubles specialist, Beckman went to the University of Texas and played collegiate tennis for four years. He was a doubles All-American in three of those years and with regular partner Royce Deppe finished NCAA doubles runners-up in 1985, to Kelly Jones and Carlos di Laura.

Beckman made Grand Slam appearances in the men's doubles 16 times and mixed doubles nine times. He didn't miss a Grand Slam event from the 1989 US Open to the 1992 US Open.  The American made the third round at three Grand Slam tournaments, the 1989 US Open (with Shelby Cannon), the 1991 US Open (with Sven Salumaa) and the 1992 French Open (with Clare Wood).

With Shelby Cannon, Beckman made the doubles final of the 1989 Player's Canadian Open, a Grand Prix Championship Series event. The pair were defeated in the final by Kelly Evernden and Todd Witsken.

Grand Prix career finals

Doubles: 1 (0–1)

Challenger titles

Doubles: (4)

References

1965 births
Living people
American male tennis players
Tennis people from Kentucky
Texas Longhorns men's tennis players
Sportspeople from Louisville, Kentucky